Charles Hollister may refer to:

 Charles M. Hollister (1867–1923), American football coach and college athletics administrator
 Charles D. Hollister, American geologist, oceanographer and mountaineer
 C. Warren Hollister (Charles Warren Hollister, 1930–1997), American historian and medievalist